The Intelligent Homosexual's Guide to Capitalism and Socialism with a Key to the Scriptures is a 2009 play by American playwright Tony Kushner. The title was inspired by George Bernard Shaw's The Intelligent Woman's Guide to Socialism and Capitalism and Mary Baker Eddy's Science and Health with Key to the Scriptures.

Production history
The world premiere was directed by Michael Greif at the Guthrie Theater in Minneapolis, opening on May 15, 2009 in previews and running through June 28.

The Public Theater and the Signature Theater Company co-produced a somewhat rewritten version of the play, which premiered Off-Broadway at the Public Theater on March 23, 2011 in previews, with opening on May 5 and closing on June 12. The play was directed by Michael Greif and featured Michael Cristofer, Linda Emond, Michael Esper and Stephen Spinella.

Berkeley Repertory Theatre presented the play's West Coast premiere starting in May 2014. Berkeley Rep Artistic Director Tony Taccone directed, and actors included Mark Margolis as Gus, Deirdre Lovejoy as Empty, and Lou Liberatore as Pill. 

The play received its London premiere in October 2016 at the Hampstead Theatre in a production directed by Michael Boyd and starring David Calder as Gus, and Tamsin Greig as Empty.

Plot
The play looks at the life of a 20th-century thinker, retired longshoreman Gus Marcantonio, who is feeling confused and defeated by the 21st century. In summer 2007, his sister, who has been staying with him for a year, invites Gus's three children (who in turn bring along spouses, ex-spouses, lovers and more) to a most unusual family reunion in their Brooklyn brownstone.

Original Guthrie Theater cast

 Mark Benninghofen as Adam Butler
 Kathleen Chalfant as Benedicta Immacolata Marcantonio (Bennie)
 Sun Mee Chomet as Sooze Moon Marcantonio
 Michael Cristofer as Augusto Giuseppe Garibaldi Marcantonio (Gus)
 Linda Emond as Maria Teresa Marcantonio (M.T.)
 Michael Esper as Eli Wolcott
 Charity Jones as Maeve Ludens
 Ron Menzel as Vito Marcantonio (V, Vic, Vinnie)
 Michelle O'Neill as Shelle O'Neill
 Michael Potts as Paul Pierce
 Stephen Spinella as Pier Luigi Marcantonio (Pill)

London premiere cast 
Hampstead Theatre - October 2016

 David Calder as Gus
 Richard Clothier as Pill
 Daniel Flynn as Adam
 Tamsin Greig as Empty
 Sara Kestelman as Clio
 Katie Leung as Sooze
 Luke Newberry as Eli
 Sirine Saba as Maeve
 Rhashan Stone as Paul
 Lex Shrapnel as V
 Katy Stephens as Shelle

Early reception
According to an article in the St. Paul Pioneer Press, only local critics were encouraged to review the play. National critics like Ben Brantley of The New York Times, who was originally invited to review the play, were asked to wait for a future production. The reviews that have been published have been somewhat mixed, acknowledging that the play is in early stages, while praising many of its positive moments. The Star Tribune ran a review stating "The lines sound great in the actors' mouths, their performances are excellent and Greif dances this show across the Guthrie stage with humor and muscular strokes. It is a very American work - a dense rush of ideas." While going on to observe that the "operatic cacophony at times skates precipitously close to the razor's edge of incoherence."

References

External links
Internet Off-Broadway Database listing
Variety review, May 25, 2009
World Socialist Web Site review, 20 July, 2011
Play Guide for Guthrie Theater production

Plays by Tony Kushner
2009 plays
Fiction set in 2007
Brooklyn in fiction
Plays set in New York City